

Gmina Izbicko, German Gemeinde Stubendorf,  is a rural gmina (administrative district) in Strzelce County, Opole Voivodeship, in south-western Poland.

Villages
Gmina Izbicko contains the villages and settlements of Borycz, Grabów, Izbicko, Krośnica, Ligota Czamborowa, Otmice, Poznowice, Siedlec, Sprzęcice, Suchodaniec and Utrata.

Neighbouring gminas
Gmina Izbicko is bordered by the gminas of Chrząstowice, Gogolin, Ozimek, Strzelce Opolskie and Tarnów Opolski.

Twin towns – sister cities

Gmina Izbicko is twinned with:

 Florstadt, Germany
 Götschetal (Petersberg), Germany
 Orebić, Croatia
 Osoblaha, Czech Republic

References

Izbicko
Bilingual communes in Poland